Jillian Cheryl Richardson-Briscoe (born March 10, 1965 in San Fernando, Trinidad and Tobago) is a Canadian athlete who competed mainly in the 400 metres. She is a three-time Olympian. In 1988, she equalled Marita Payne's Canadian 400 metres record of 49.91 secs. The record (as of 2022) still stands. She was inducted into the Athletics Canada Hall of Fame in 2017.

Richardson won a gold medal at the 1982 Commonwealth Games as a member of the 4 x 400 meter relay team. She repeated that feat at the 1986 Commonwealth Games, as well as winning a silver in the 400 meters. She was a member of the 4 x 400 metre relay that took a silver medal in the 1983 Pan American Games. She won a silver in the 400 meters at the 1987 Pan American Games, and as part of the Canadian 4 x 400 meter relay team. She took a gold medal in the 400 metres and a silver medal in the 4 x 400 metre relay at the 1989 Francophone Games.

She competed for Canada at three Olympic Games. At the 1984 Olympics in Los Angeles, she won the silver medal in the 4 x 400  metres relay with her team mates Charmaine Crooks, Molly Killingbeck and Marita Payne. At the 1988 Olympics in Seoul, she was eliminated in the 400 metres semi-finals, running 49.91. It was the first time someone had broken 50 seconds and failed to reach the final. Canada failed to finish the 4 × 400 m relay final due to an injury to Molly Killingbeck. At the 1992 Olympics in Barcelona, she finished fifth in the 400 m final, in 49.93 and fourth in the 4 × 400 m relay final.

Achievements
Three-time Canadian Champion - 400 m (1987) 200 m (1988, 1989)
Canadian 400m record holder - 49.91 in 1988 (shared with Marita Payne)

See also
 Canadian records in track and field

References

External links
 
 
 
 
 
 

1965 births
Living people
Canadian female sprinters
Black Canadian female track and field athletes
Canadian sportspeople of Trinidad and Tobago descent
Olympic silver medalists for Canada
Athletes (track and field) at the 1984 Summer Olympics
Athletes (track and field) at the 1988 Summer Olympics
Athletes (track and field) at the 1992 Summer Olympics
Olympic track and field athletes of Canada
Athletes (track and field) at the 1982 Commonwealth Games
Athletes (track and field) at the 1986 Commonwealth Games
Commonwealth Games gold medallists for Canada
Commonwealth Games silver medallists for Canada
Commonwealth Games medallists in athletics
Athletes (track and field) at the 1983 Pan American Games
Athletes (track and field) at the 1987 Pan American Games
Pan American Games silver medalists for Canada
Pan American Games bronze medalists for Canada
Pan American Games medalists in athletics (track and field)
World Athletics Championships athletes for Canada
Medalists at the 1984 Summer Olympics
Olympic silver medalists in athletics (track and field)
Universiade medalists in athletics (track and field)
Universiade silver medalists for Canada
World Athletics Indoor Championships medalists
Medalists at the 1983 Summer Universiade
Medalists at the 1983 Pan American Games
Medalists at the 1987 Pan American Games
Olympic female sprinters
Medallists at the 1982 Commonwealth Games
Medallists at the 1986 Commonwealth Games